On 17 December 2012, an Antonov An-26 (registration OB-1887-P) operated by Amazon Sky, crashed in  Tomas District.

The aircraft had been flying from Peru's capital of Lima to an airfield of the Argentinian company Pluspetrol in the Cusco Region and was carrying a crew of 4 people.
The accident occurred at about 15:42 local time as the aircraft firstly touched a mountain peak, then crashed in steep terrain. The site of the accident was only found the day after the crash.

The investigation commission found out that failure of both engines due to ice had caused the crash. The crew had failed to properly use the anti-icing.

References

External links
 Final report 

Aviation accidents and incidents in Peru
Accidents and incidents involving the Antonov An-26